Maurice Raymond “Hank” Greenberg (born May 4, 1925) is an American business executive and former chairman and chief executive officer of American International Group (AIG).

Early life
Greenberg was born into a Jewish family in Greenwich Village, New York City. His father, Jacob Greenberg, died when Hank was six and his mother, Ada Rheingold, married a dairy farmer. Greenberg served in the United States Army in Europe during World War II, participating in Operation Overlord (the Normandy Landings), Liberation of Dachau, and in the Korean War, rising to the rank of captain; he is a recipient of the Bronze Star, as well as Commandeur of the French Ordre National de la Legion d' Honneur as a result of his military service in the European Theater during World War II.

Greenberg received his bachelor's degree from the University of Miami in 1948, where he was a member of Sigma Alpha Mu fraternity, and his law degree from New York Law School in 1950. He was admitted to the New York Bar in 1953. He holds honorary degrees from several colleges including Brown University, Middlebury College, New York Law School and The Rockefeller University.

Rise and fall at AIG
In 1962 Greenberg was named by AIG's founder, Cornelius Vander Starr, as the head of AIG's North American holdings after working for Continental Casualty Company, a unit of CNA in Chicago.  In 1968 Starr picked Greenberg as his successor.  Greenberg held the position until March 2005, when he retired from AIG and was replaced by Martin J. Sullivan. He was subsequently the subject of New York State civil charges which were resolved on February 10, 2017, subject to a settlement (without any admission of wrongdoing) with the office of the New York Attorney General. Greenberg is a social friend and was a client of Henry Kissinger. In 1987 he appointed Kissinger as chairman of AIG's International Advisory Board.

In 2003, Vladimir Putin pursued an economic agenda for Russia to begin normalized trade relations with the West which included the repeal of the Jackson–Vanik amendment. Putin tried to use his relationship with Hank Greenberg to repeal the Jackson-Vannik provisions in the United States. Putin wanted Greenberg to support through American Insurance Group greater development of the nascent Russian home-mortgage market.

In 2008 he appeared on ABC's "Good Morning America" criticizing the board of directors of AIG.
In an interview with Reactions magazine in March 2010, serialized over three parts, Greenberg stated that he did not condone AIG's strategy of selling non-core assets to pay back the United States government, and believed the terms under which AIG was provided access to bail-out funds needed to be renegotiated.

Other public positions
Greenberg is chairman emeritus of the US-ASEAN Business Council. He was also vice chairman and director of the Council on Foreign Relations and a member of David Rockefeller's Trilateral Commission. He was awarded "CEO of the Year 2003" by Chief Executive magazine.

In 1990 Greenberg was appointed by Zhu Rongji, then Mayor of Shanghai, to be the first chairman of the International Business Leaders' Advisory Council for the Mayor of Shanghai.  In 1994 Greenberg was appointed senior economic advisor to the Beijing municipal government.  He was awarded "Honorary Citizen of Shanghai" in 1997.  He is a member of the advisory board of the Tsinghua School of Economics and Management, a member of the International Advisory Council of the China Development Research Foundation and China Development Bank.

Greenberg was appointed as a member of the Hong Kong Chief Executive's Council of International Advisers where he served from 1998 to 2005. He is a former chairman and current trustee of the Asia Society, a trustee emeritus of the Rockefeller University, and is an honorary trustee of the Museum of Modern Art, all three institutions founded by the Rockefeller family. He is also a former chairman and current member of the US–Korea Business Council and a member of the US-China Business Council. Greenberg also sits on the steering committee of the China–United States Exchange Foundation. He has served on the board of directors of the New York Stock Exchange, the President's Advisory Committee for Trade Policy and Negotiations, and the Business Roundtable. He was a director of the Federal Reserve Bank of New York from 1988-1995 and served as its Chairman from 1994-5. He is vice-chairman of the board of directors of the National Committee on United States – China Relations.

Greenberg is chairman emeritus of the Board of Trustees of New York-Presbyterian Hospital and joined the Board 1979. He serves as a member of the board of overseers of the Weill Cornell Medical College of Cornell University, as a life trustee of New York University, a trustee for the School of Risk Management, Insurance, and Actuarial Science and is the chairman of the Academic Medicine Development Company. Greenberg also serves as a member of the President's Council on International Activities of Yale University. He is on the board of directors of the International Rescue Committee and is active in a number of other civic and charitable organizations. He is a former trustee of the American Museum of Natural History. He also serves on the board of the Manhattan Institute for Policy Research.

He is chairman and chief executive officer of C.V. Starr, a diversified financial services firm that is named for the founder of AIG, Cornelius Vander Starr.  He joined C.V. Starr as vice president in 1960 and was given the additional responsibilities of president of American Home Assurance Company in 1962.  He was elected director of C.V. Starr in 1965, chairman and chief executive officer in 1968 and continues in that role.  Greenberg is also the chairman of the board of directors and managing director of Starr International Company Inc.  C.V. Starr and Starr International are collectively known as the Starr Companies. Greenberg was named the most connected business executive in New York by Crain's New York Business.

As chairman of The Starr Foundation, Greenberg oversees the disbursement of major financial support to academic, medical, cultural, and public policy institutions.  He is also the former chairman of The National Interest. The Maurice "Hank" Greenberg Scholarship, administered in his name by the US-China Education Trust, supports the studies of ten Chinese students from low-income families each year at Yunnan University. In February 2014 Greenberg led a group through Starr Investment Holdings that acquired health insurance claims processor MultiPlan Inc for around $4.4 billion. This group, on May 5, 2016, sold MultiPlan Inc. to Hellman & Friedman for approximately $7.5 billion.

Incident with Mahmoud Ahmadinejad
Greenberg gained visibility when he clashed with Mahmoud Ahmadinejad over the Iranian president's denial of the Holocaust. On September 20, 2006, the Council on Foreign Relations hosted a small meeting of select council members with Ahmadinejad, who began by saying that we need to "continue studying" whether it happened. According to David E. Sanger, Chief Washington Correspondent for The New York Times, Greenberg listened for fifteen minutes while Ahmadinejad continued talking about the Palestinians, World War II, and if the Holocaust killings had happened at all.  Sanger writes,
"Then Hank Greenberg, who had been on a slow boil through the evening, spoke up. He had been a young soldier at the end of the war, and participated in the liberation of the camps. 'I went through Dachau in the war and saw with my own eyes.'" President Ahmadinejad responded by asking if Greenberg was old enough to have participated in the liberation of Dachau. "I'd like an answer regarding whether you think the Holocaust occurred," insisted Greenberg. To which Ahmadinejad replied "I think we should allow more impartial studies to be done on this."

Legal issues
The State Attorney General's Office pursued Greenberg in a New York State civil court action which concluded with a settlement (without any admission of wrongdoing) on February 10, 2017.  Eliot Spitzer did bring civil charges against Greenberg, though Spitzer and his successors dropped seven of the nine initial charges. Those charges were brought under a 1921 New York State blue sky law (the Martin Act) that authorizes the New York Attorney General to seek relief for alleged violations of the state securities laws without the need to prove a knowing violation of the law (scienter) or an intent to defraud.

In November 2012 a Manhattan court dismissed Greenberg's claims that the Federal Reserve Bank of New York breached its fiduciary duties to AIG shareholders. In late 2011 Greenberg's Starr International announced a lawsuit against the federal government. According to Reuters, the lawsuit seeks $55.5 billion in damages against the government stemming from the government's financial bailout in 2008. Following a lengthy trial in Fall 2014, the Court of Federal Claims ruled in June 2015 that the federal government acted without authority, but did not award any damages. In a decision on appeal in the US Court of Appeals for the Federal Circuit in Washington, DC, a three judge panel remained silent with regard to the Court of Claims decision on both liability and damages, but claimed that Starr lacked standing to file the suit in question, holding that standing belonged solely to AIG. The Supreme Court declined in 2018 to review the case. The market value of the 79.9% of AIG common stock the government acquired on the day of the government agreed to loan AIG up to $85 billion was $55.4 billion. By the end of 2012, AIG had repaid all of its loans and the government had made a $17.7 billion profit on the AIG equity it had acquired as a result, plus $6.7 billion in interests and fees.

In July 2013 Greenberg filed a civil lawsuit against Spitzer alleging that Spitzer made repeated defamatory statements against him. This matter was stayed pending a decision on cross-appeals that were argued before the Second Department of New York's Appellate Division in March 2016. In December, 2013 Greenberg filed a complaint with the New York State Joint Commission on Public Ethics alleging that New York State Attorney General Eric Schneiderman had violated the state's public officer's law by making disparaging comments about him that could potentially taint a jury venire in any trial. On September 13, 2016, the accounting fraud case against Greenberg came to trial in a state courthouse in Lower Manhattan 11 years after he was first charged. The case ultimately settled with Greenberg agreeing to pay $9.9 million.

Political involvement
Greenberg is a major Republican donor. He donated to Mitt Romney's presidential candidacy. In the Republican Party presidential primaries, 2016 he donated $10 million to support Jeb Bush's candidacy and at a later point also donated $5 million to Conservative Solutions PAC which supported Marco Rubio's campaign.

In July 2022, Greenberg announced the founding of a group composed of senior U.S. business and policy leaders who share the view that the United States should engage more constructively with China. Greenberg stated, "The deteriorating state of affairs between the U.S. has destabilized the most important bilateral relationship in the world," and the new group is intended to "help foster a meaningful but frank exchange between the U.S. and Chinese governments on issues of mutual concern."

Personal life
Greenberg married Corinne Phyllis Zuckerman in 1950 and they have four children:
 Jeffrey W. Greenberg, former chairman and chief executive officer of Marsh & McLennan Companies, chairman and CEO of Aquiline Capital Partners, which he founded in 2005 in New York.
 Evan G. Greenberg, chairman and chief executive officer of Chubb Ltd and Chubb Group.
 L. Scott Greenberg, venture capitalist in New York.
 Cathleen Greenberg London, physician in Milbridge, ME.

Works by and about Hank Greenberg
Greenberg and Lawrence Cunningham wrote The AIG Story, published in 2013.

Greenberg's career is chronicled in the 2006 book Fallen Giant: The Amazing Story of Hank Greenberg and the History of AIG. He and his son, Jeffrey, are also discussed in the 2011 book All the Devils Are Here: The Hidden History of the Financial Crisis. Greenberg is discussed in the 2011 book, Wealth Management: Private Banking, Investment Decisions, and Structured Financial  Products He is noted in the 2012 book, Black 9/11: Money, Motive and Technology

Awards
2015: Commandeur de l'Ordre National de la Légion d'honneur
 2014: French Ordre National de la Légion d'honneur
 2009: Double Helix Medal
 1952: Bronze Star Medal for service in Korea

References

Further reading
 "Greenberg and Sons", Fortune magazine, February 21, 2005.
 review: James Freeman, "Insurer to the World," Wall Street Journal Feb. 6. 2013

External links
 Starr Companies
 Hank Greenberg Weighs in on AIG on The Strategy Session , "The Strategy Session", CNBC, May 26, 2011
 Council on Foreign Relations: Biographical information
 "World's Richest People", Forbes magazine, 2004.
 Asia Times on Greensberg-AIG Connection to China
 "A followup on AIG with Hank Greenberg", Charlie Rose, September 17, 2008
 Fallen Giant official website
 $50 Million Gift to Advance Yale’s China Collaborations, Yale University, September 28, 2006
 

|-

|-

1925 births
American chief executives of financial services companies
Philanthropists from New York (state)
Living people
New York Law School alumni
Businesspeople from New York City
University of Miami alumni
20th-century American Jews
American International Group people
Peterson Institute for International Economics
Jewish American military personnel
United States Army personnel of World War II
United States Army personnel of the Korean War
United States Army officers
21st-century American Jews